University President's House or College President's House may refer to:

Dodd College President's Home, NRHP-listed in Caddo Parish
Brandeis University President's House, Massachusetts
University President's House (Las Cruces, New Mexico)
Harbison College President's Home, Abbeville, South Carolina
Westminster College President's House, Salt Lake City, Utah, NRHP-listed in Salt Lake City

See also
List of university and college presidents' houses
List of university and college presidents' houses in the United States
President's House (disambiguation)